Germana Di Natale (born 2 April 1974) is a former professional tennis player from Italy.

Biography
A right-handed player, Di Natale started playing tennis at the age of ten and began touring in the early 1990s.

Di Natale was a singles bronze medalist at the 1997 Summer Universiade.

As a professional player she is most noted for her quarterfinal appearance as a qualifier at the 2000 WTA Madrid Open, where she had a win over the top seed Mary Pierce en route. Starting the tournament with a ranking of 258, she upset the world's sixth ranked player Pierce with a straight-sets second-round win. In the quarterfinals, she had to retire hurt while trailing Iva Majoli by a set due to an injury to her right arm.

During her career, she competed in the qualifying draws of all four Grand Slam tournaments.

ITF finals

Singles (1–2)

Doubles (4–5)

References

External links
 
 

1974 births
Living people
Italian female tennis players
Tennis players from Rome
Universiade medalists in tennis
Universiade bronze medalists for Italy
Medalists at the 1997 Summer Universiade
20th-century Italian women